The Corsican wildcat is an isolated feral cat (Felis catus) population that used to be considered a subspecies of the African wildcat (Felis lybica), but is now thought to have been introduced to Corsica around the beginning of the first millennium.

In 2019, several newspapers reported on the supposed discovery of the Corsican wildcat as a previously unknown cat species, calling it "cat-fox". As of 2021, a description for this animal as a potential new species is being drafted, and other research was ongoing.

Taxonomy 
The scientific name Felis reyi was proposed by Louis Lavauden in 1929 who described a skin and a skull of a female cat specimen from Biguglia and considered it a new species. It was reclassified as a subspecies of the African wildcat by Reginald Innes Pocock who reviewed Felis skins in the collection of the Natural History Museum, London. Following zooarchaeologic research in Corsica, it was regarded to have been introduced to the island during the Roman Empire, likely originating from domestic cat stock. As of 2017, it is no longer considered a valid species or subspecies.

However, in January 2023, a scientific paper was published with results of genetic testing on Corsican wildcats, finding they were genetically distinct from both the European wildcat and domestic cat species.

Characteristics 
The Corsican wildcat was described as being darker than the African wildcat with a shorter tail and dark brown on the backs of the ears.

Further description detailed that the Corsican wildcat is approximately 90 centimeters from head to tail. The front legs are striped, the hind legs are very dark brown, and the stomach fur is russet; the whole of the coat is dense and silky. The tail is the most distinctive: ringed and black-tipped.

In culture 
The Corsican wildcat featured in the local shepherds' folklore as forest cats who would attack the udders of their ewes and goats.

See also 
 Sardinian lynx

References 

Wildcats
Mammals described in 1929
Endemic fauna of Corsica